Temples of the Church of Jesus Christ of Latter-day Saints are buildings dedicated to be a House of the Lord, and they are considered by church members to be the most sacred structures on earth. Upon completion, temples are usually open to the public for a short period of time (an "open house"). During the open house, the church conducts tours of the temple with missionaries and members from the local area serving as tour guides, and all rooms of the temple are open to the public. The temple is then dedicated as a "House of the Lord," after which only members twelve years of age and older who hold a current and valid temple recommend are permitted entrance; weekly worship services are not held in temples, but rather ordinances that are part of Latter-day Saint worship are performed within temples.

Within temples, members of the church make covenants, receive instructions, and perform sacred  ordinances, such as: baptism for the dead, washing and anointing (or "initiatory" ordinances), the "endowment," and eternal marriage sealings. Ordinances are a vital part of the theology of the church, which teaches that they were practiced by the Lord's covenant people in all dispensations. Additionally, members consider the temple a place to commune with God, seek His aid, understand His will, and receive personal revelation.

History

In 1832, shortly after the formation of the church, Joseph Smith said that the Lord desired the saints build a temple; and they completed the Kirtland Temple in 1836. Initially, the church constructed temples in areas where there were large concentrations of members: Utah, Idaho, Arizona, Hawaii (all in the USA), and Alberta (Canada). In the mid-20th century, because of the importance of temples in the theology, the church tried to balance density with the travel requirements attending the temple imposed upon members. Thus, temples were built in Europe (namely, Switzerland dedicated in 1955 and England dedicated in 1958); the Pacific Islands (namely, New Zealand dedicated in 1958); and Washington, D.C. (dedicated in 1974, the first American temple East of Utah since Nauvoo in 1846). All were dedicated at a time when membership in the region alone might not have justified the effort.

In the 1980s, Spencer W. Kimball directed the church to build smaller temples with similar designs allowing temples to be built where there were fewer members. As a result, the first temples in South America (Brazil dedicated in 1978); Asia (Japan dedicated in 1980); and Mexico (Mexico City dedicated in 1983) were built and the number of temples doubled from 15 to 36.

Church president Gordon B. Hinckley (1910–2008) also accelerated the construction of temples through the use of an even smaller standardized base design.
In 1998, when there were 51 temples, Hinckley set a goal to have 100 temples in place before the end of 2000. Between the brief building period from 1998 to 2001, 38 of these standardized temples were constructed and dedicated, meeting Hinckley's goal by having 102 dedicated temples before 2000 closed. During Hinckley's service as president, the number of temples more than doubled from 47 to 124.

On October 7, 2018, Russell M. Nelson announced the intent to construct 12 more temples, putting the church's total number of temples operating, under construction, or announced above 200.

List of temples

Destroyed or operated by others

Dedicated

Dedication scheduled
Temples below have scheduled dedication dates and are ordered by announced dedication date and time (earliest to most recent). If two or more have dedications at the same scheduled time (GMT), then those temples will be listed in alphabetical order.

Under construction
Temples under construction are ordered by groundbreaking date and time (earliest to most recent). If two or more groundbreakings occur at the same scheduled time (GMT), then they will be listed in alphabetical order.

Groundbreaking scheduled
Temples in this section have had groundbreakings scheduled, and are listed by the scheduled date. If more than one groundbreaking is set for the same date, the temples are ordered by time zone, from east to west starting at the international date line. When two or more temples are listed on the same date and in the same time zone, then these temples will be listed in chronlogical order (by the time of day in which the groundbreaking(s) occur).

Groundbreaking postponed
On January 30, 2023, the church announced plans to break ground for the Port Vila Vanuatu Temple on March 5, 2023. In late February, a massive cyclone hit Vanuatu, with another one anticipated to batter the island nation further. As a result, the groundbreaking was postponed indefinitely until it can safely take place.

Announced
Temples are listed by the date on which they were announced. If multiple temples are announced on the same day, those temples are listed in order in which they were announced.

Efforts suspended
The following is a list of temples that had been announced and in some stage of development, but whose construction is not actively being pursued at this time.

See also
 Council House (Salt Lake City) 
 Red Brick Store
 Temple architecture (Latter-day Saints)

References

Sources
  (official list)
  (Almanac)

External links

 Temple List at ChurchofJesusChrist.org Official site 

Lists of religious buildings and structures
Temples (LDS Church)
Latter Day Saint movement lists